The Montenegrin Men's Handball Cup (Montenegrin: Rukometni Kup Crne Gore) is an elimination handball tournament held annually. It is the second most important national title in Montenegrin handball after the Montenegrin First League.

It has been held annually since Montenegrin independence in 2006.

History

Montenegrin clubs in Yugoslav Cup
Before Montenegrin independence, clubs from that Republic played in national handball Cup of Yugoslavia / Serbia and Montenegro. Most successful was RK Lovćen with two trophies won. 
First significant success at that time made RK Mornar, who played in Yugoslav Cup 1994-95 finals, but lost against RK Crvena zvezda. Two years later, another Montenegrin team played in the final of Yugoslav Cup - RK Lovćen, but they were defeated against RK Partizan (39-36; 21-30). Same rivals played in the Cup finals 2000-01 and once again RK Partizan won the trophy.
First trophy for RK Lovćen came in 2001-02 on final-four in Vršac, defeating RK Sintelon (19:18) in the final. Year later, Lovćen won the final four in Belgrade (final match against RK Partizan - 28:26). Serbia and Montenegro Cup final 2004-05 was the last one in which participated RK Lovćen. On that game, Montenegrin side was defeated by  RK Vojvodina (25-32).
Below is a list of Yugoslav Cup trophies won by Montenegrin clubs.

Montenegrin Cup (2006-)
Except Montenegrin First League of Men's Handball as a top-tier league competition, after the independence, Handball Federation of Montenegro established Montenegrin Cup as a second elite national tournament. Inaugural season of Montenegrin Cup was 2006-07, and by now most successful was RK Lovćen with 9 titles. One title won RK Berane, RK Sutjeska, RK Partizan Tivat and RK Komovi Andrijevica.
Three different teams won the first three editions of the Cup - RK Berane (2006-07), RK Sutjeska (2007-08) and RK Lovćen (2008-09). That was the beginning of successful era of RK Lovćen who won seven consecutive titles from 2009 to 2015. Except that, on season 2013-14, RK Lovćen scored 41 goals in the final game against RK Danilovgrad which is the all-time record.
On season 2015-16, RK Partizan won their first Cup trophy, and next two years, the Cup winner was RK Lovćen. Big surprise came on season 2018-19, as the Cup winner became RK Komovi, based in the small town Andrijevica.

Competition

Tournament format
There are two phases of Montenegrin Men's Handball Cup. At first, there are two elimination phases in February - round of 16 and the quarterfinals.
Winners of quarterfinals are participating in the second phase - Final tournament, which held on the Montenegrin Independence Day - May 21.

Final four
Traditional event, Final tournament of Montenegrin Cup, every year is organising on 20/21 May. During the first day, there are two Semi-finals, and final match is playing on the Independence Day (May 21).
Until today, hosts of Montenegrin Cup Final tournament were cities Cetinje (6), Danilovgrad (3) , Tivat (2), Podgorica (1), Pljevlja (1), Budva (1), Bijelo Polje (1) and Mojkovac (1).

Participants 

During the history, 15 different clubs played at the Final tournament of Montenegrin Handball Cup. Below is the list of participants on every Final tournament.
 2006/07: RK Berane, RK Lovćen Cetinje, RK Mornar Bar, RK Cepelin Cetinje
 2007/08: RK Sutjeska Nikšić, RK Berane, RK Lovćen Cetinje, RK Mornar Bar
 2008/09: RK Lovćen Cetinje, RK Budućnost Podgorica, RK Mojkovac, RK Berane
 2009/10: RK Lovćen Cetinje, RK Sutjeska Nikšić, RK Budućnost Podgorica, RK Budvanska rivijera Budva
 2010/11: RK Lovćen Cetinje, RK Mojkovac, RK Rudar Pljevlja, RK Sutjeska Nikšić
 2011/12: RK Lovćen Cetinje, RK Mojkovac, RK Budvanska rivijera Budva, RK Sutjeska Nikšić
 2012/13: RK Lovćen Cetinje, RK Mojkovac, RK Ulcinj, RK Danilovgrad
 2013/14: RK Lovćen Cetinje, RK Danilovgrad, RK Budvanska rivijera Budva, RK Sutjeska Nikšić
 2014/15: RK Lovćen Cetinje, RK Budvanska rivijera Budva, RK Berane, RK Rudar Pljevlja
 2015/16: RK Partizan Tivat, RK Lovćen Cetinje, RK Budvanska rivijera Budva, RK Berane
 2016/17: RK Lovćen Cetinje, RK Mojkovac, RK Partizan Tivat, RK Budvanska rivijera Budva
 2017/18: RK Lovćen Cetinje, RK Partizan Tivat, RK Jedinstvo Bijelo Polje, RK Ivangrad Berane
 2018/19: RK Komovi, RK Partizan Tivat, RK Budvanska rivijera Budva, RK Jedinstvo
 2019/20: RK Lovćen Cetinje, RK Partizan Tivat, RK Komovi, RK Budućnost Podgorica
 2020/21: RK Lovćen Cetinje, RK Komovi, RK Partizan Tivat, RK Budvanska rivijera Budva
 2021/22: RK Lovćen Cetinje, RK Budvanska rivijera, RK Budućnost Podgorica, RK Rudar Pljevlja

There is no any single team which participated on every final tournament. Most appearances on final tournament have Lovćen (14). On season 2012/13, Danilovgrad became first team from the Second league which participated on the Final tournament.

Winners and finals

Season by season
During the past, most successful team in Montenegrin Cup was RK Lovćen Cetinje. 
Below is the list of final matches of Montenegrin Handball Cup

Trophies by team

Montenegrin Cup
There are nine different clubs which participated in the final match of Montenegrin Cup.

Four of them won the Cup.

Overall
Below is an overall list, including titles won in both national Cups - Montenegrin Cup and FR Yugoslavia / Serbia and Montenegro Cup.

See also 
 Montenegrin First League of Men's Handball
 Montenegrin Second League of Men's Handball

External links 
Handball Federation of Montenegro

First League
Montenegrin handball clubs